{{Infobox person
|name          = Gus McLeod
|image         = North Pole Stearman.JPG
|caption       = McLeod's Stearman in the College Park Aviation Museum
|birth_date    = 
|birth_place   = 
|death_date    = 
|death_place   = 
|death_cause   = 
|resting_place = 
|resting_place_coordinates = 
|nationality   = 
|citizenship   = 
|other_names   = 
|known_for     = Subject of an award-winning National Geographic special, Arctic Flyer.
|education     = B.A. Catholic University  studied chemical engineering [[University of Maryland]]
|alma_mater    = 
|employer      = Executive Director, Green L. Martin Maryland Aviation Museum, Middle River, Maryland, Proxy Aviation Systems, Inc.
|occupation    = Chemical engineer, former CIA agent
|title         = 
|height        = 
|term          = 
|predecessor   = 
|successor     = 
|party         = 
|boards        = 
|spouse        = Mary
|partner       = 
|children      = 3 including Hera
|parents       = 
|relations     = 
|signature     = 
|website       = 
|footnotes     = 
| television  = The Amazing Race 6}}

Gustavus A. McLeod (born 1954) is an American pilot and author whose exploits have been featured in reality television appearances. He was the first person to fly over the North Pole in an open-cockpit biplane.

Biography
McLeod grew up in Corinth, Mississippi, the son of a Methodist minister. McLeod is a 1976 graduate of The Catholic University of America in Washington, D.C.

On April 17, 2000, he became the first person to fly over the North Pole in an open-cockpit biplane.

McLeod is an entrepreneur who, in 2004, lived in Laytonsville, Maryland. However, in 2004 he was also reported to live in Gaithersburg, Maryland.

He has a wife, Mary, and three children.

McLeod was featured in a four-column article in the Smithsonian in April 2003, because he planned to fly his "...Beech 18 solo from the South Pole to the North Pole, a 32,000 mile trip, in about two months".

The UK aeronautic company Cobham plc reports in an employee newsletter dated June 2005 that McLeod is a former CIA chemist, and is currently a businessman based in Maryland.

Works
 Solo to the Top of the World: Gus McLeod's Daring Record Flight, 2003, 245 pages 

Appearances
 Television — Inside Base Camp: Tori Murden and Gus McLeod, 2002
 Television — The Amazing Race 6, Nov 14, 2004

The Amazing Race

The Amazing Race 6

In August 2004, McLeod competed on the sixth season of the CBS adventure reality show The Amazing Race with his daughter, Hera. They were eliminated at the end of the sixth leg, finishing in seventh place.

The Amazing Race 6 finishes

 An italicized placement means it is a Gus and Hera's placement at the midpoint of a double leg.
A  placement with a dagger indicates that Jonathan and Victoria were eliminated. Roadblocks performed by Gus are bolded Notes

References

Bibliography
 Smithsonian magazine, April 2003, pg 42 Flight of Fancy''

External links
 
 Update 19 January 2004
 PR newswire update November 2005

American aviators
Explorers of the Arctic
American non-fiction writers
1954 births
Living people
The Amazing Race (American TV series) contestants
Catholic University of America alumni
People of the Central Intelligence Agency
People from Corinth, Mississippi